The Missouri and North Arkansas Depot-Leslie is a historic railroad station at the end of Walnut Street in Leslie, Arkansas.  It is a long rectangular single-story building, with stone walls and a bellcast hip roof with extended eaves.  A telegrapher's bay projects from the southwest side.  It was built c. 1925, and is a surviving representative of the economic success brought to the community with the arrival of the railroad in 1903.

The station was listed on the National Register of Historic Places in 1992.

See also
National Register of Historic Places listings in Searcy County, Arkansas

References

Railway stations on the National Register of Historic Places in Arkansas
Railway stations in the United States opened in 1925
Transportation in Searcy County, Arkansas
National Register of Historic Places in Searcy County, Arkansas
Former railway stations in Arkansas